Sherkat-e Sahami Mehr (also Romanized as Sherkat-e Sahāmī Mehr) is a village in Fahraj Rural District, in the Central District of Yazd County, Yazd Province, Iran. At the 2006 census, its population was 135, in 25 families.

References 

Populated places in Yazd County